Grove Hill New Mission Church (also known as Omena Presbyterian Church) is a historic church located at 5098 North West Bay Shore (M-22) in Omena, Michigan.  It was constructed in 1858, designated a Michigan State Historic Site in 1971, and listed on the National Register of Historic Places in 1972.

History
In 1839, the Presbyterian Board of Missions sent the Reverend Peter Dougherty to the Grand Traverse area.  He founded a mission located at what is now called Old Mission, Michigan.  He organized a church, including both European and Native Americans, in 1843.  In 1852, Dougherty and his mission moved to what is now Omena, establishing a "New Mission" there and constructing a mission and boarding school.  In 1858, Dougherty commissioned three local carpenters to build this church, based on traditional New England church design.  The church was used by the congregation until 1871, when financial difficulties forced the mission to close.

In 1885, the church was re-opened as a Congregationalist church.  Since 1925, it has been used primarily in the summer months.  It is still used as the Omena Presbyterian Church.

Description
The Grove Hill New Mission Church is a rectangular frame front-gable structure sided with white clapboard. The roof is covered with shingles, and is capped with a square steeple. The front entrance is covered with a triangular pediment supported by two pillars.

References

Further reading

Presbyterian churches in Michigan
Churches on the National Register of Historic Places in Michigan
Churches completed in 1858
Buildings and structures in Leelanau County, Michigan
Michigan State Historic Sites
National Register of Historic Places in Leelanau County, Michigan
Historic district contributing properties in Michigan
Wooden churches in Michigan